Events from the year 1917 in Vietnam

Incumbents  
 Monarch: Khải Định

Births 

 Chu Tử in the Sơn Tây Province
 Trương Đình Dzu in the Bình Định Province
 Tran Duc Thao in Bắc Ninh
 Nguyễn Thị Kim in Hanoi
 Nguyễn Tôn Hoàn in Tây Ninh
 Nguyễn Văn Tỵ in Hanoi

References 

1910s in Vietnam